Chay Kandi (also Romanized as Chāy Kandī; also known as Chāikhāna, Chaykendy, and Chāykhāneh) is a village in Dizmar-e Sharqi Rural District, Minjavan District, Khoda Afarin County, East Azerbaijan Province, Iran. At the 2006 census, its population was 19, in 7 families.

References 

Populated places in Khoda Afarin County